Francisco Reyes may refer to:

 Francisco Reyes (equestrian), Argentine equestrian
 Francisco Reyes Morandé, Chilean actor
 Francisco Reyes (colonial-era Filipino banker)
 Francisco Reyes (illustrator), Filipino illustrator
 Francisco Reyes (footballer, born 1990), Honduran football goalkeeper
 Francisco Reyes (footballer, 1941-76), Paraguayan football midfielder